John O'Mahony (1816–1877) was founder of the Irish Republican Brotherhood.

John O'Mahony may also refer to:
John O'Mahony (Mayo politician) (born 1953), Irish Fine Gael politician representing Mayo and twice an All-Ireland winner managing the Galway Football Team
John O'Mahony (Gaelic footballer) (born 1937), Irish retired Gaelic footballer
John O'Mahony (Australian footballer) (born 1931), Australian footballer for Hawthorn
Sean Matgamna (born 1941), also known as John O'Mahony, Trotskyist theorist
Seán O'Mahony (1864–1934), Sinn Féin politician who represented the South Fermanagh constituency
John O Mahoney, Irish Gaelic footballer